Columba Aspexit is a sequence written by Hildegard of Bingen in the late 12th century.  It is one of seven sequences from her collection of lyrical poetry entitled Symphonia armonie celestium revelationum. This piece is found in only one manuscript: HS 2; Hessische Landesbibliotek, Wiesbaden, "Riesenkodex" (1175).

A Sequence is a dramatic poem that is sung between the Alleluia and the Gospel in the Mass. While most sequences have rhymed pairs of lines, Hildegard's are more through-composed. Columba Aspexit was written about St. Maximinus, whose feast is celebrated on 29 May.  The date which it written is between 1175 and the 1180s.

Recordings 
Von Bingen, Hildegard. Columba Aspexit, sequence for Maximinus. Hildegard von Bingen: O Nobilissima Viriditas. Catherine Schroeder, voice. Media 7, W79931, CD, 1996. 
Von Bingen, Hildegard. Columba Aspexit. A Feather on the Breath of God. Christopher Page, conductor. Gothic Voices, 020BD512, CD, 2006.

References

Further reading
Burkholder, J. Peter, Donald Jay Grout, and Claude V. Palisca. A History of Western Music. New York: W. W. Norton & Company, 2010.

External links 
Boyce-Tillman, June."Hildegard of Bingen at 900. The Eye of a Woman." The Musical Times 	139, No. 1865 (1998), https://www.jstor.org/stable/1003833
MacLellan, Genevieve. "Hildegard of Bingen: Symphony of the Harmony of Heaven." Nancy Fierro. http://www.hildegard.org/music/music.html (accessed December 7, 2011).
Richard L. Crocker, et al. "Sequence (i)." Grove Music Online. Oxford Music Online, http://www.oxfordmusiconline.com/subscriber/article/grove/music/25436(accessed Dec 1st 2011)

12th-century poems